The Hütter Hü 136 was an experimental dive bomber design produced by German engineers Wolfgang and Ulrich Hütter during World War II.

Design 
The Hütters, best known as glider designers, responded to Reich Air Ministry calls for high-performance, strongly built dive bombers. The Sturzbomber or Stubo specification came in two parts: Stubo 1, a single-seater with the flight capabilities of a fighter but armoured and with a  bombload; and Stubo 2, a two-seat bomber with similar performance but a  bombload.

The Hü 136 design was highly innovative, with the pilot sitting far to the rear of the aircraft, his cockpit forming part of the vertical tail surface. The design had no undercarriage, with a jettisonable dolly for takeoff and a retractable skid for landing. To overcome the likelihood of contact between the propeller and the ground on landing, the propeller would be blown off before landing and descend separately by parachute.

The German Air Ministry (Reichsluftfahrtministerium) did not pursue the design, preferring to adopt the existing Henschel Hs 129.

Specifications

Replica 
One replica is on display at the Military Aviation Museum in Virginia Beach, Virginia.

References

See also

1940s German bomber aircraft